The Steiger Ferris Wheel is a  tall transportable Ferris wheel. It began operating in 1980, and at that time was the world's tallest transportable wheel, a record documented in the Guinness Book of Records. The world's tallest transportable wheel  is the  Bussink Design R80XL.

Designed by the Steiger showmen company of Bad Oeynhausen, in conjunction with engineering company Dr. Cassens and Jäschke of Bremen, it was built by Kocks, also of Bremen, and is operated by Steiger. It has 42 passenger cars, and weighs 450 tons.

The foundation of the wheel consists of the 22 container pallets used to transport components of the wheel. In total, 32 vehicles are needed to transport the entire wheel. Two of the jackstands supporting the axle also serve as cranes to erect the A-frame. The wheel is equipped with a complex LED lighting system, allowing complex multi-coloured patterns to be displayed.

On October 11, 2010, the wheel collapsed at the Kramermarkt in Oldenburg during deconstruction. Although several people watched the deconstruction work, nobody was injured.

References

External links

Transportable Ferris wheels